The second HMS Fitzroy (K553) was a British Captain-class frigate of the Royal Navy in commission during World War II. Originally constructed as a United States Navy Buckley class destroyer escort, she served in the Royal Navy from 1943 to 1945.

Construction and transfer
The ship was laid down as the unnamed U.S. Navy destroyer escort DE-88 by Bethlehem-Hingham Shipyard, Inc., in Hingham, Massachusetts, on 24 August 1943 and launched on 1 September 1943. She was transferred to the United Kingdom upon completion on 16 October 1943.

Service history

Commissioned into service in the Royal Navy as the frigate HMS Fitzroy (K553) on 16 October 1943 simultaneously with her transfer, the ship served on patrol and escort duty.

The Royal Navy decommissioned Fitzroy later in 1945 and returned her to the U.S. Navy on 5 January 1946.

Disposal
The U.S. Navy struck Fitzroy from its Naval Vessel Register on 7 February 1946. She was sold on 23 May 1946 for scrapping.

References

External links
Photo gallery of HMS Fitzroy (K553)

 

Captain-class frigates
Buckley-class destroyer escorts
World War II frigates of the United Kingdom
Ships built in Hingham, Massachusetts
1943 ships